The 86th Street station is a local station on the IND Eighth Avenue Line of the New York City Subway. Located at Central Park West and 86th Street on the Upper West Side, it is served by the B on weekdays, the C train at all times except nights, and the A train during late nights only.

History
The station opened on September 10, 1932, as part of the city-operated Independent Subway System (IND)'s initial segment, the Eighth Avenue Line between Chambers Street and 207th Street. Construction of the whole line cost $191.2 million (equivalent to $ million in ). While the IRT Broadway–Seventh Avenue Line already provided parallel service, the new Eighth Avenue subway via Central Park West provided an alternative route.

Under the 2015–2019 MTA Capital Plan, the station underwent a complete overhaul as part of the Enhanced Station Initiative and was entirely closed for several months. Updates included cellular service, Wi-Fi, USB charging stations, interactive service advisories and maps. A request for proposals for the 72nd Street, 86th Street, Cathedral Parkway–110th Street, and 163rd Street–Amsterdam Avenue stations was issued on June 1, 2017, and the New York City Transit and Bus Committee officially recommended that the MTA Board award the $111 million contract to ECCO III Enterprises in October 2017. As part of the renovations, the station was closed from June 4, 2018, to October 26, 2018.

Station layout

This underground station has two levels with northbound trains on the upper level and southbound trains on the lower one. From west to east, each level has one side platform, one local track and one express track.

The platforms have no tile band, but mosaic name tablets reading "86TH ST." in white sans-serif lettering on a midnight blue background with a black border are present. There are also small "86" tile captions and directional signs in white lettering on a black background. Grey (previously blue) I-beam columns run along both platforms at regular intervals with alternating ones having the standard black station name plate in white lettering.

Exits

This station has three fare control areas, all of which are on the upper level. The full-time one at 86th Street is at the south end and has a turnstile bank, token booth, and three street stairs. Right inside fare control, there is a staircase going down to the lower level. The station's other two entrances/exits are unstaffed. The one at 87th Street, at the center of the upper level, has a staircase connecting both platforms. The third fare control area at 88th Street has three turnstiles and one gate, installed as part of the station's renovation. These replace the two HEET turnstiles and one exit-only turnstile which were present beforehand.

 One stair, NW corner of Central Park West and West 86th Street
 Two stairs, SW corner of Central Park West and West 86th Street
 One stair, NW corner of Central Park West and West 87th Street
 One stair, NW corner of Central Park West and West 88th Street

References

External links 

 nycsubway.org — IND 8th Avenue: 86th Street 
 Station Reporter — B Train
 Station Reporter — C Train
 The Subway Nut — 86th Street Pictures 
 86th Street entrance from Google Maps Street View
 87th Street exit only stairs from Google Maps Street View
 88th Street entrance from Google Maps Street View
 Platform from Google Maps Street View

IND Eighth Avenue Line stations
Eighth Avenue (Manhattan)
New York City Subway stations in Manhattan
Railway stations in the United States opened in 1932
Upper West Side
Central Park
1932 establishments in New York City